Centrolepis humillima, commonly known as dwarf centrolepis, is a species of plant in the Restionaceae family and is found in Western Australia.

It blooms between September and December.

It is found amongst moss beds and along the margins of salt lakes and claypans in the Wheatbelt, Mid West, Great Southern and Goldfields-Esperance regions of Western Australia where it grows in sandy-clay soils.

References

humillima
Plants described in 1878
Flora of Western Australia
Poales of Australia